Erodium hendrikii, or heron's bill, is a plant in the Geraniaceae family. It is critically endangered.

Distribution 
It is  native to Turkey.

Taxonomy 
It was named by Kerim Alpınar  in  Edinburgh J. Botany, 51: 68, in 1994.

References

External links 

Flora of Turkey
hendrikii